The 2005 Campeonato Nacional Apertura Copa Banco del Estado  was the 77th Chilean League top flight, in which Unión Española won its 7th league title after beating Coquimbo Unido in the finals.

Qualifying stage

Results

Group standings

Group A

Group B

Group C

Group D

Aggregate table

Repechaje

Playoffs

Finals

First leg

Top goalscorers

References

External links
RSSSF Chile 2005

Primera División de Chile seasons
Chile
2005 in Chilean football